Zidona is a genus of sea snails, marine gastropod mollusks in the family Volutidae.

Species
Species within the genus Zidona include:
 Zidona dufresnei (Donovan, 1823)
Synonyms
 Zidona (Ericusa) H. Adams & A. Adams, 1858: synonym of Ericusa H. Adams & A. Adams, 1858 (original rank)
 Zidona palliata Kaiser, 1977: synonym of Provocator palliatus (Kaiser, 1977) (basionym)

References

 Bail, P.; Poppe, G.T. (2001). A conchological iconography: a taxonomic introduction of the recent Volutidae. ConchBooks, Hackenheim. 30 pp, 5 pl.

External links
 Adams H. & Adams A. (1853-1858). The genera of Recent Mollusca; arranged according to their organization. London, van Voorst. Vol. 1: xl + 484 pp.; vol. 2: 661 pp.; vol. 3: 138 pls. [Published in parts: Vol. 1: i-xl (1858), 1-256 (1853), 257-484 (1854). Vol. 2: 1-92 (1854), 93-284 (1855), 285-412 (1856), 413-540 (1857), 541-661 (1858). Vol. 3: pl. 1-32 (1853), 33-96 (1855), 97-112 (1856), 113-128 (1857), 129-138 (1858) 
 https://www.biodiversitylibrary.org/page/14544363  Orbigny, A. D. d'. (1834-1847). Voyage dans l'Amérique méridionale [... exécuté pendant les années 1826, 1827, 1828, 1829, 1830, 1831, 1832 et 1833. Tome 5(3) Mollusques. pp. i-xliii, 1-758, 85 plates]

Volutidae
Monotypic gastropod genera